The Texas State Guard Service Medal is the twelfth highest campaign/service award that may be issued to a service member of the Texas Military Forces. There is no provision for subsequent awards.

Eligibility
The Texas State Guard Service Medal is awarded to any member of the Texas Military Forces who:

 After 1 September 1970
 Completes three consecutive years of honorable service in the Texas State Guard
 During which period they have shown fidelity to duty, efficient service, and great loyalty to the State of Texas

Authority

Awarding 
Issuance of the Texas State Guard Service Medal requires authorization by the Texas State Guard Commanding General and presentation to the awardee by the next higher level of command.

Legal 
The Texas State Guard Service Medal was originally authorized by Executive Order Number 41-36, signed by Governor Coke R. Stevenson on 1 December 1943. It was authorized in its present form by the Sixty-fourth Texas Legislature in Senate Bill Number 724 and approved by Governor Dolph Briscoe on 20 May 1975, effective same date.

Description 
The medal pendant is an antique bronze finished Maltese Cross, 1-1/8 inches in diameter. On the obverse side of the pendant, a wreath of laurel fits between the arms of the cross with the seal of the Texas State Guard in the center. The seal is a shield on which is a raised five-pointed star, one point up, over which is the letter, "T." Around this seal and inside the arms of the cross are the words "TEXAS STATE GUARD" along the upper 3/4 of the arc and the word "SERVICE" centered on the lower arc. On the reverse side of the pendant is a five-pointed raised star, one point up, 1/2 inch in diameter, surrounded by a wreath, formed by an olive branch on the right and a live oak branch on the left. The pendant is suspended by a ring from a rayon moiré yellow ribbon, 1-3/8 of an inch long and 1-3/8 of an inch wide, with perpendicular stripes of red, white, and dark blue, each 3/32 of an 1 inch wide in the center.

Notable Recipients

See also
 Awards and decorations of the Texas Military
 Awards and decorations of the Texas government
 Texas Military Forces
 Texas Military Department
 List of conflicts involving the Texas Military

References 

Texas
Texas Military Forces
Texas Military Department